The fourth USS Shark (SP-534) was a United States Navy patrol vessel in commission from 1917 to 1919.

Shark was built as the civilian motorboat Ildico IV in 1909 at South Yarmouth, Massachusetts. She later was renamed Shark. The U.S. Navy purchased Shark from her owner, Louis Herzog of New York City, on 17 May 1917 for World War I service as a patrol vessel. She was commissioned on 24 May 1917 as USS Shark (SP-534).

Assigned to section patrol duty in the 1st Naval District in northern New England, Shark conducted harbor patrols there for the rest of World War I and for a few months after the end of the war.

Shark was stricken from the Navy List on 16 September 1919 and sold to Morgan Barnes on 20 October 1919.

Notes

References

Department of the Navy: Navy History and Heritage Command: Online Library of Selected Images: U.S. Navy Ships: USS Shark (SP-534), 1917-1919. Originally the Civilian Motor Boat Ildico IV and Shark
NavSource Online: Section Patrol Craft Photo Archive: Shark (SP 534)

Patrol vessels of the United States Navy
World War I patrol vessels of the United States
Ships built in Massachusetts
1909 ships